Willowfield is a defunct intermediate football club which existed in Northern Ireland during the inter-war years. The club was formed by the Willowfield Unionist Club in 1918.

In the 1927–28 season, it became the first from outside the Irish League to win the Irish Cup since the League's formation in 1890. They defeated Larne 1–0 in the final at Windsor Park. Willowfield had previously reached the Irish Cup final in 1923–24, when they lost to Queen's Island.

The club played from 1918 to 1926 at the Cregagh Recreation Grounds (home of Cregagh Cricket Club), and then at the Willowfield Recreation Grounds (now Gibson Park Avenue), which is now the home of Malone Rugby Club, who acquired it in 1935.  The club played in the Irish Intermediate League and folded in 1930.

Honours

Senior honours
Irish Cup: 1
1927–28

Intermediate honours
Irish Intermediate League: 1
1927–28
Irish Intermediate Cup: 2
1923–24, 1927–28
Steel & Sons Cup: 1
1927–28
Clarence Cup: 1
1935–36

Junior honours
Irish Junior Cup: 2
1906–07, 1907–08
Beattie Cup: 3
1914–15, 1915–16, 1922–23
County Antrim Junior Shield: 1
1916–17†

† Won by Willowfield II

References

Defunct association football clubs in Northern Ireland
Association football clubs established in 1890
Association football clubs disestablished in 1930
Association football clubs in Belfast
1890 establishments in Ireland
1930 disestablishments in Northern Ireland